The Masonic Temple in Lincoln, Nebraska is a building from 1934. It was listed on the National Register of Historic Places in 2005.

It was designed by Lincoln architects Meginnis and Schaumberg in a restrained Art Deco style.

References

Clubhouses on the National Register of Historic Places in Nebraska
Masonic buildings completed in 1935
Buildings and structures in Lincoln, Nebraska
Masonic buildings in Nebraska
National Register of Historic Places in Lincoln, Nebraska